This glossary of surfing includes some of the extensive vocabulary used to describe various aspects of the sport of surfing as described in literature on the subject. In some cases terms have spread to a wider cultural use. These terms were originally coined by people who were directly involved in the sport of surfing.

About the water

A-Frame: Wave with a peak that resembles an A and allows surfers to go either left or right, with both sides having a clean shoulder to work with.
Barrel: (also tube, cave, keg, green room) The effect when a big wave rolls over, enclosing a temporary horizontal tunnel of air with the surfer inside
 Beach break: An area with waves that are good enough to surf break just off a beach, or breaking on a sandbar farther out from the shore
Big sea: Large, unbreaking surf
 Blown out: When waves that would otherwise be good have been rendered too choppy by wind
 Bomb: An exceptionally large set wave
Bottom: Refers to the ocean floor, or to the lowest part of the wave ridden by a surfer
Channel: A deep spot in the shoreline where waves generally don't break, can be created by a riptide pulling water back to the sea and used by surfers to paddle out to the waves
 Chop or choppy: Waves that are subjected to cross winds, have a rough surface (chop) and do not break cleanly 
 Close-out: A wave is said to be "closed-out" when it breaks at every position along the face at once, and therefore cannot be surfed
Crest: The top section of the wave, or peak, just before the wave begins to break 
Curl: The actual portion of the wave that is falling or curling over when the wave is breaking
 Face: The forward-facing surface of a breaking wave 
 Flat: No waves
 Glassy: When the waves (and general surface of the water) are extremely smooth, not disturbed by wind 
 Gnarly: Large, difficult, and dangerous (usually applied to waves) 
Green: The unbroken portion of the wave, sometimes referred to as the wave shoulder
Inshore: The direction towards the beach from the surf, can also be referring to the wind direction direction traveling from the ocean onto the shore
 Line-up: The queue area where most of the waves are starting to break and where most surfers are positioned in order to catch a wave
Mushy: A wave with very little push
 Off the hook: An adjective phrase meaning the waves are performing extraordinarily well 
 Outside: Any point seaward of the normal breaking waves
Peak: The highest point on a wave
 Pocket: The area of the wave that's closest to the curl or whitewash. Where you should surf if you want to generate the most speed. The steepest part of a wave, also known as the energy zone.
Pounder: An unusually hard breaking wave
 Point break: Area where an underwater rocky point creates waves that are suitable for surfing
 Riptide: A strong offshore current that is caused by the tide pulling water through an inlet along a barrier beach, at a lagoon or inland marina where tide water flows steadily out to sea during ebb tide
 Sections: The parts of a breaking wave that are rideable
Sectioning: A wave that does not break evenly, breaks ahead of itself
 Set waves: A group of waves of larger size within a swell
 Shoulder: The unbroken part of a breaking wave

 Surf's up: A phrase used when there are waves worth surfing
 Swell: A series of waves that have traveled from their source in a distant storm, and that will start to break once the swell reaches shallow enough water
Trough: The bottom portion of the unbroken wave and below the peak, low portion between waves
Undertow: An under-current that is moving offshore when waves are approaching the shore
Wall: The section of the wave face that extends from the shoulder to the breaking portion, where the wave has not broken and where the surfer maneuvers to ride the wave
Wedge: Two waves traveling from slightly different direction angles that converge to form a wedge when they merge, where the wedge part of the two waves usually breaks a great deal harder than the individual waves themselves
Whitecaps: The sea foam crest over the waves
 Whitewater: In a breaking wave,  the water continues on as a ridge of turbulence and foam called "whitewater" or also called "soup"

Techniques and maneuvers

 Air/Aerial: Riding the board briefly into the air above the wave, landing back upon the wave, and continuing to ride
Backing out: pulling back rather than continuing into a wave that could have been caught
 Bail: To step off the board in order to avoid being knocked off (a wipe out)
 Bottom turn: The first turn at the bottom of the wave
 Carve: Turns (often accentuated)
 Caught inside: When a surfer is paddling out and cannot get past the breaking surf to the safer part of the ocean (the outside) in order to find a wave to ride
 Cheater five: See Hang-five/hang ten
 Cross-step: Crossing one foot over the other to walk down the board 
 Drop in: Dropping into (engaging) the wave, most often as part of standing up
 "To drop in on someone": To take off on a wave that is already being ridden.  Not a legitimate technique or maneuver.  It is a serious breach of surfing etiquette.
Drop-knee: A type of turn where both knees are bent where the trail or back leg is bent closer to the board than the lead or front leg knee
 Duck dive: Pushing the board underwater, nose first, and diving under an oncoming wave instead of riding it
 Fade: On take-off, aiming toward the breaking part of the wave, before turning sharply and surfing in the direction the wave is breaking, a maneuver to stay in the hottest or best part of the wave
 Fins-free snap (or "fins out"): A sharp turn where the surfboard's fins slide off the top of the wave
 Floater: Riding up on the top of the breaking part of the wave, and coming down with it
 Goofy foot: Surfing with the left foot on the back of board (less common than regular foot)
Grab the rail: When a surfer grabs the board rail away from the wave 
 Hang Heels: Facing backwards and putting the surfers' heels out over the edge of a longboard
 Hang-five/hang ten: Putting five or ten toes respectively over the nose of a longboard
Kick-out: Surfer throwing their body weight to the back of the board and forcing the surfboard nose straight up over the face of the wave, which allows the surfer to propel the board to kick out the back of the wave
Head dip: The surfer tries to stick their head into a wave to get their hair wet 
 Nose ride: the art of maneuvering a surfboard from the front end
 Off the Top: A turn on the top of a wave, either sharp or carving
 Pop-up: Going from lying on the board to standing, all in one jump
 Pump: An up/down carving movement that generates speed along a wave
 Re-entry: Hitting the lip vertically and re-reentering the wave in quick succession.
 Regular/Natural foot: Surfing with the right foot on the back of the board
 Rolling, Turtle Roll: Flipping a longboard up-side-down, nose first and pulling through a breaking or broken wave when paddling out to the line-up (a turtle roll is an alternative to a duck dive)
 Smack the Lip /Hit the Lip: After performing a bottom turn, moving upwards to hit the peak of the wave, or area above the face of the wave.
 Snaking, drop in on, cut off, or "burn": When a surfer who doesn't have the right of way steals a wave from another surfer by taking off in front of someone who is closer to the peak (this is considered inappropriate)
 Snaking/Back-Paddling: Stealing a wave from another surfer by paddling around the person's back to get into the best position
 Snap: A quick, sharp turn off the top of a wave
 Soul arch: Arching the back to demonstrate casual confidence when riding a wave
 Stall: Slowing down by shifting weight to the tail of the board or putting a hand in the water. Often used to stay in the tube during a tube ride
 Side-slip: travelling down a wave sideways to the direction of the board
 Switchfoot: Ambidextrous, having equal ability to surf regular foot or goofy foot (i.e. left foot forward or right foot forward)  
 Take-off: The start of a ride
 Tandem surfing: Two people riding one board. Usually the smaller person is balanced above (often held up above) the other person
 Tube riding/Getting barreled: Riding inside the hollow curl of a wave

Accidental

 Over the falls: When a surfer falls off the board and the wave sucks them up in a circular motion along with the lip of the wave. Also referred to as the "wash cycle", being "pitched over" and being "sucked over"
 Wipe out: Falling off, or being knocked off, the surfboard when riding a wave
 Rag dolled: When underwater, the power of the wave can shake the surfer around as if they were a rag doll
 Tombstone: When a surfer is held underwater and tries to climb up their leash the board is straight up and down
Pearl: Accidentally driving the nose of the board underwater, generally ending the ride

About people

 Dilla: A surfer who is low maintenance, without concern, worry or fuss, One who is confidently secure in being different or unique
 Grom/Grommet/Gremmie: A young surfer
 Hang loose: Generally means "chill", "relax" or "be laid back". This message can be sent by raising a hand with the thumb and pinkie fingers up while the index, middle and ring fingers remain folded over the palm, then twisting the wrist back and forth as if waving goodbye, see shaka sign
 Hodad: A nonsurfer who pretends to surf and frequents beaches with good surfing 
 Kook: A wanna-be surfer of limited skill
 Waxhead: Someone who surfs every day

About the board

 Blank: The block from which a surfboard is created
 Deck: The upper surface of the board
 Ding: A dent or hole in the surface of the board resulting from accidental damage
 Fin or Fins: Fin-shaped inserts on the underside of the back of the board that enable the board to be steered
 Leash: A cord that is attached to the back of the board, the other end of which wraps around the surfer's ankle
 Nose : The forward tip of the board
 Quiver: A surfer's collection of boards for different kinds of waves
 Rails: The side edges of the surfboard
 Rocker: How concave the surface of the board is from nose to tail
 Stringer: The line of wood that runs down the center of a board to hold its rigidity and add strength
 Tail: The back end of the board
 Wax: Specially formulated surf wax that is applied to upper surface of the board to increase the friction so the surfer's feet do not slip off the board
Leggie: A legrope or lease. The cord that connects your ankle to the tail of surfboard so it isn't washed away when you wipe out. Made of lightweight urethane and available in varying sizes. With thicker ones for big waves and thinner ones for small waves.
Thruster: A three-finned surfboard originally invented back in 1980 by Australian surfer Simon Anderson. It is nowadays the most popular fin design for modern surfboards.

Clothing

 Board shorts; also known as Baggies.
 Pendleton jacket; popularized by the Beach Boys.
 Rash guard: a shirt that protects surfers from sunburns and abrasion
 Wetsuit: Often referred to as "rubber", sometimes surfers also wear a neoprene hood and booties in cold conditions

Further reading

See also
 Surf culture

Notes

References

External links

 
 

Surfing
 
Wikipedia glossaries using unordered lists